Vaultsevo is a rural locality (a village) in Pekshinskoye Rural Settlement, Petushinsky District, Vladimir Oblast, Russia. The population was 6 as of 2010. There are 2 streets.

Geography 
Vaultsevo is located 22 km northeast of Petushki (the district's administrative centre) by road. Sitnikovo is the nearest rural locality.

References 

Rural localities in Petushinsky District